Proposition 31 is a 1968 novel written by Robert Rimmer that tells the story of two middle-class, suburban California couples who adopt a relationship structure of polyfidelity to deal with their multiple infidelities, as a rationalistic alternative to divorce. The novel is presented as a case study by a psychologist supporting a fictional "Proposition 31" that would amend the California Constitution to recognize nonmonogamous relationships. In the book, the solution to the couples' problems with adultery and the impregnation of one couple's wife by the other couple's husband is to commit to a group marriage to raise their five children in a home compound in which the husbands rotate among the wives. The book is a plea to pass this proposed proposition to offer a sane alternative to divorce.

1968 American novels
Novels set in California
Adultery in novels
Novels by Robert Rimmer

References